Vitali Yuryevich Yermilov (born 8 June 1970) is a former Russian professional football player.

Since 2015 he has been working as a junior trainer in Saratov.

Honours
 Russian Second Division top scorer: 2001 (Zone Ural, 26 goals), 2003 (Zone Ural / Povolzhye, 23 goals).

References

External links
 

1970 births
People from Belaya Kalitva
Living people
Russian footballers
Russian Premier League players
FC Rostov players
FC Sokol Saratov players
FC KAMAZ Naberezhnye Chelny players
FC Arsenal Tula players
FC Taganrog players
Association football forwards
Sportspeople from Rostov Oblast